Raise the Titanic! is a 1976 adventure novel by Clive Cussler, published in the United States by the Viking Press. It tells the story of efforts to bring the remains of the ill-fated ocean liner RMS Titanic to the surface of the Atlantic Ocean in order to recover a stockpile of an exotic mineral that was being carried aboard.

Raise the Titanic! was the third published book to feature the author's protagonist, Dirk Pitt. It was the first of Cussler's novels with a prologue set long before the main story, describing an incident with consequences resolved in the present day.

The book was adapted into a 1980 feature film, Raise the Titanic, directed by Jerry Jameson. The film was produced by Lord Grade's ITC Entertainment. Although it starred respected and popular actors and boasted a big budget, the movie was a box office bomb and received little critical or popular praise and was also disliked by Cussler.

Plot 
In 1987, Dr. Gene Seagram leads the top-secret Pentagon program Meta Section, which secretly attempts to leapfrog current technology by 20 to 30 years. One result: the Sicilian Project, which uses sound waves to stop incoming ballistic missiles. The immense power needs of the Sicilian Project can be met only by an extremely rare mineral called Byzanium. After satellite data pinpoints the most likely source of Byzanium, Meta Section sends Sid Koplin to Novaya Zemlya, an island off the northern coast of the Soviet Union. There he discovers that the byzanium ore has already been mined. While making his way back to his hidden boat Koplin is shot and captured by a Soviet guard but is rescued by the story's protagonist, Dirk Pitt.

Using clues found by Koplin, Seagram determines that the byzanium — a chunk worth more than a quarter of a billion dollars in 1912 figures — was mined in the early part of the 20th century by a group of Coloradan miners, including Joshua Hayes Brewster. The group was originally hired by the French government, but persuaded by the U.S. government to steal the mineral for the United States. Brewster and his men engage in a running battle with French assassins as they crisscross Europe trying to get their stolen goods home. Only Brewster reaches Southampton alive, and he books passage on the maiden voyage of the great White Star Line ship RMS Titanic.

Realizing that the only supply of byzanium sufficient to power the Sicilian Project now lies at the bottom of the North Atlantic, Dr. Seagram approaches Dirk Pitt and the National Underwater and Marine Agency and gives them the near impossible task of raising the Titanic. Using data from drop tank experiments Pitt is able to narrow down the search area and begin searching with deep sea submersibles. After finding a presentation model cornet that they can link positively to a member of the Titanic'''s band, Pitt and his colleagues know they are searching in the right place. After discovering that the Titanic is intact they set out on an audacious plan to patch all of the holes and then raise the wreck using compressed air.

Meanwhile the Central Intelligence Agency convinces the President of the United States to leak information on both the Sicilian Project and the Titanic mission to the Soviet Union in the hopes of setting a trap to capture one of the Soviets' best intelligence officers in the KGB. When Soviet leaders realize that the development of the Sicilian Project would throw off the balance of power in the world and leave their nuclear arsenal impotent, they do just as the CIA hopes and launch an operation to sabotage the mission and steal the byzanium for themselves.

Once the Titanic is secured for the trip to the United States, a massive hurricane strikes the salvage area, allowing the Soviets to covertly board the ship and take the crew hostage. Pitt, who was previously believed dead after being last seen on board a crashed helicopter, reemerges to expose the Soviet spies within the salvage crew. With the help of Navy SEALs who boarded from a hidden U.S. Navy submarine, the crew regain control of the Titanic. The ship is eventually towed to New York Harbor and laid up in the Brooklyn Navy Yard. When the ship's vault is opened, all are shocked to discover the byzanium was never actually aboard the ship. This revelation, coupled with deep troubles with his marriage and the President's agreement to leaking word of the Sicilian Project to the Soviets, eventually cause Dr. Seagram to have a nervous breakdown from which he never recovers. It is eventually revealed that Joshua Hayes Brewster, fearful that he would not make it onto the ship with the mineral, buried the byzanium in the grave of Vernon Hall, the last of the group to fall to the French assassins, located in the tiny English village of Southby. The novel ends with a successful test of the Sicilian Project in the Pacific Ocean.

Characters
listed alphabetically
Georgi Antonov - General Secretary of the Soviet Union who authorizes the attempt to sabotage the raising of the TitanicAdeline Austin - the widow of Jake Hobart
Commodore Sir John L. Bigelow - the last surviving member of the Titanic crew
Joshua Hayes Brewster - a well-known and respected mining engineer
Marshall Collins - National Security Adviser to the U.S. President
Mel Donner - one of two chief evaluators for Meta Section
Ben Drummer - Russian spy in the employ of National Underwater and Marine Agency (NUMA)
Graham Farley - the cornet player on the TitanicAl Giordino - Assistant Special Projects Director for the National Underwater and Marine Agency (NUMA)
Commander Rudi Gunn - Commander of the Lorelei Current Drift Expedition
Jake Hobart - one of "the Coloradans", an elite group of miners that dug mines in the Colorado Rockies in the early 20th century
Officer Peter Jones - Washington, D.C. police officer
Admiral Joseph Kemper - Chief of Naval Operations of the United States Navy
Sid Koplin - professor of mineralogy sent to Novaya Zemlya by Meta Section in search of byzanium
Lieutenant Pavel Marganin - Aide to Captain Prevlov who is, in fact, an American spy named Harry Koskoski
Sam Merker - brother of Ben Drummer and also a Soviet spy on the NUMA crew
Henry Munk - Sappho II crewman
Warren Nicholson - Director of the CIA
Captain Ivan Parotkin - Captain of the Soviet oceanographic research vessel Mikhail KurkovDirk Pitt - Special Projects Director for the National Underwater and Marine Agency (NUMA)
Vladimir Polevoi - Chief of the Foreign Secrets Directorate of the KGB
Captain Andre Prevlov - Russian intelligence officer for the Soviet Navy's Department of Foreign Intelligence; the Soviet Navy's top spymaster
Admiral James Sandecker - Director of the National Underwater and Marine Agency (NUMA)
Dr. Dana Seagram - wife of Dr. Gene Seagram of Meta Section; a marine archaeologist employed by National Underwater and Marine Agency (NUMA)
Dr. Gene Seagram - physicist and a chief evaluator for Meta Section
Dr. Murray Silverstein - Director of the Alexandria College of Oceanography
Admiral Boris Sloyuk - Director of Soviet Naval Intelligence
Vasily Tilevitch - Marshal of the Soviet Union and Chief Director of Soviet Security
John Vogel - Chief curator for the Washington Museum's Hall of Music

 Publication details 
 1976, United States, The Viking Press 0-670-58933-0, October 26, 1976, hardcover
 1976, United States, The Viking Press, hardcover book club edition
 1976, Canada, The Macmillan Company of Canada Limited, hardcover
 1977, United Kingdom, Michael Joseph Limited 0 7181 1579 1, hardcover
 1990, United States, Pocket Books 0-671-72519-X, April 1, 1990, mass market paperback
 2004, United States, Berkeley reissue edition 0-425-19452-3, February 3, 2004, paperback

 Comics adaptation 
An adaptation of the novel was serialized as the first story in the short-lived comic strip "Best Sellers Showcase". The adaptation ran from August 15 to October 9 in 1977.  Depending on the newspaper, the Sunday color strip appeared in two versions. One version had a title box followed by two frames of story resulting in a three row episode. The other version did not have the title box nor the following two frames thereby resulting in a two row episode.

 Prequel 
A prequel to Raise the Titanic! was published by Clive Cussler and Jack Du Brul in September 2019 entitled The Titanic Secret. The story describes the details of Joshua Hayes Brewster and his mining team's escape from Novaya Zemlya and pursuit across Europe. The story is told from the perspective of Isaac Bell who has been hired to investigate the apparent death of Brewster and his mining team.

 See also 
 The Ghost from the Grand Banks; a novel by Arthur C. Clarke featuring the halves of the Titanic'' being raised by two different factions

References

External links 

Dirk Pitt novels
1976 American novels
Fiction set in 1987
Novels about RMS Titanic
Viking Press books
American novels adapted into films